Leninsky is a rural locality (a settlement) in Novopokrovskoye Rural Settlement, Novokhopyorsky District, Voronezh Oblast, Russia. The population was 245 as of 2010. There are 4 streets.

References 

Populated places in Novokhopyorsky District